Peavey is a surname. Notable people with the surname include:

 Hartley Peavey (born 1941), American businessman, founder of Peavey Electronics
 Henry Peavey (1882–1931), American murder suspect
 Hubert H. Peavey (1881–1937), American politician
 Jack Peavey (born 1963), American football player
 John Peavey (born 1933), American politician